Make It Pop is a Canadian musical comedy television series created by Thomas W. Lynch and Nick Cannon that aired on Nickelodeon from March 26, 2015 to August 20, 2016. The series stars Megan Lee, Louriza Tronco, Erika Tham, and Dale Whibley.

Series overview

Episodes

Season 1 (2015)

Special (2015)

Season 2 (2016)

Special (2016)

References 

Lists of Canadian children's television series episodes
Lists of Canadian comedy television series episodes
Lists of Nickelodeon television series episodes